Julián Sánchez may refer to:

 Julián Sánchez (diver) (born 1988), Mexican diver
 Julián Sánchez (cyclist) (born 1980), Spanish road bicycle racer
 Julian Sanchez (writer) (born 1979), American writer
 Julián Sánchez Garcia (1771–1832), Spanish guerrilla leader in the Peninsular War